Jerzykowo may refer to the following places:
Jerzykowo, Gniezno County in Greater Poland Voivodeship (west-central Poland)
Jerzykowo, Poznań County in Greater Poland Voivodeship (west-central Poland)
Jerzykowo, Warmian-Masurian Voivodeship (north Poland)